Sam Small Leaves Town, also known by the alternative title It's Sam Small Again, is a 1937 British comedy film directed by Alfred J. Goulding and starring Stanley Holloway, June Clyde and Fred Conyngham.

Premise
In order to win a bet a famous actor leaves London and goes to work incognito in a holiday camp.

Cast
 Stanley Holloway - Richard Manning
 June Clyde - Sally Elton
 Fred Conyngham - Jimmy West
 Harry Tate - Camper
 Johnnie Schofield - Sam Small
 James Craven - Steve Watt
 Robert English - Robert Harrison

References

External links

1937 films
1937 comedy films
Films directed by Alfred J. Goulding
British comedy films
British black-and-white films
1930s English-language films
1930s British films